Airan is a former commune in the Calvados department in the Normandy region of northwestern France. On 1 January 2017, it was merged into the new commune Valambray.

The inhabitants of the commune are known as Airannais or Airannaises

Geography
Airan is located some 17 km south-east of Caen and 25 km east by south-east of Lisieux. It can be accessed from the D40 from Vimont in the north-west, passing through the south of the commune and continuing south-east to Vieux-Fumé. The D613 (Route de Paris) also from Vimont passes through the north of the commune and continues east to Crèvecœur-en-Auge. Neither road passes the village which can be accessed by the D47 road from Moult in the west which passes through the village then the heart of the commune before continuing south-east to Cesny-aux-Vignes. There is also the D43 road coming from the north through the village and continuing south to Fierville-Bray. The railway from Caen to Mézidon-Canon passes through the commune from west to east but there is no station in the commune. The nearest station is Bonafini to the west. The commune is quite large in extent and consists almost entirely of farmland with a few small patches of forest. Apart from the village there are also the hamlets of Le Haute-des-Pedouzes, Le Ruel, Valmeray, and Coupigny.

The Muance river forms part of the western border of the commune before it flows west then north to join the Dives river through a network of canals near Bures-sur-Dives. The Douet also rises in the north of the commune and forms part of the northern border before continuing north to join the Dives near Hernetot.

Toponymy
The name is of Continental Germanic origin in an area where such origins are rare (Heidram from the 9th century), possibly a personal name taken from Heidrammus or alternatively the name -ham preceded by an appellative or an unidentified person's name.

History
Archaeological excavations have uncovered the remains of a Merovingian necropolis. There is a legend of the famous Treasure of Airan.

In 1942, the resistance caused two derailments in the commune - on the night of 15 to 16 April and also on 30 April to 1 May. These two derailments left a total of forty dead and fifty wounded German soldiers who were on leave in these trains. Following this Nazi repression was brutal for many hostages: some were shot, others deported.

Administration

List of Successive Mayors of Airan

Population

Culture and heritage

Civil heritage
The commune has a number of buildings and structures that are registered as historical monuments:
A Water Mill (1682) is typical of the Caen region.
The Chateau of Coupigny (18th century)
The Chateau of Coupigny Park (18th century)

Other sites of interest
Valmeray Tower and its surroundings are classified by DREAL Lower Normandy as an historical monument. The ruined tower is located in a hamlet near Airan. An old legend tells of a secret passage connecting the tower to the church at Airan. The legend also says that the old bell in gold from the church is hidden in the secret passage. Many people have tried to find it but without success.
The Alley of Lime Trees along the D43 is also registered with DREAL.

Religious heritage
The commune has several religious buildings and structures that are registered as historical monuments:
The Church of Saint Germain (12th century) has a Romanesque facade.

Picture Gallery

See also
Communes of the Calvados department

External links
Airan on the 1750 Cassini Map

Notes and references

Notes

References

Former communes of Calvados (department)
Populated places disestablished in 2017